Hamlet is a 1912 British silent drama film directed by Charles Raymond and starring Raymond, Dorothy Foster and Constance Backner. It was an adaptation of the play Hamlet by William Shakespeare.

Cast
 Charles Raymond - Hamlet
 Dorothy Foster - Ophelia
 Constance Backner - Gertrude

See also
List of ghost films

External links

1912 films
1912 drama films
1910s English-language films
Films directed by Charles Raymond
Films based on Hamlet
British silent short films
British drama films
British black-and-white films
1910s British films
Silent drama films